Nicholas Van Vranken Franchot II (May 5, 1884 – December 14, 1938) was an American businessman and politician from New York.

Biography
He was the son of State Senator Stanislaus P. Franchot (1851–1908) and Annie Powers (Eells) Franchot (1852–1935). He engaged in the insurance business. On October 12, 1909, he married Alice Pearson.

He was a member of the New York State Assembly (Niagara Co., 2nd D.) in 1918, 1919 and 1921.

He died on December 14, 1938, in Niagara Falls, New York.

Legacy
New York Superintendent of Public Works Nicholas Van Vranken Franchot (1855–1943) was his uncle; and Congressman Richard Franchot (1816–1875) was his grandfather.

References

1884 births
1938 deaths
Politicians from Niagara Falls, New York
Republican Party members of the New York State Assembly
20th-century American politicians